Grebo (or grebo rock) was a short-lived subgenre of alternative rock that incorporated influences from punk rock, electronic dance music, hip hop and psychedelia. The scene occupied the period in the late 1980s and early 1990s in the United Kingdom before the popularisation of Britpop and grunge. The genre and its attributes were largely absorbed into industrial rock, which would emerge after the sub-genre's demise in the late 1980s, which then led to the development of industrial metal in the 1990s.

History and etymology
The word grebo was originally used as a slang term for bikers and rock music fans with long hair. The word was re-fashioned by the group Pop Will Eat Itself that represented a brand of United Kingdom subculture of the late 1980s and early 1990s, largely based in the English Midlands. The scene particularly centred in Birmingham.

Influential bands in the scene were Pop Will Eat Itself (who had songs titled, "Oh Grebo I Think I Love You" and "Grebo Guru"), the Wonder Stuff, Ned's Atomic Dustbin, along with London band Carter USM and Leicester bands Crazyhead, the Bomb Party, the Hunters Club, Scum Pups and Gaye Bykers on Acid. The term has also been used to describe Jesus Jones, who enjoyed success in both the United Kingdom and the United States.

Although short-lived, the movement was a success and influenced several later bands. To a certain extent it was a music press invention, much like positive punk, a scene and style named by British indie magazines NME and the Melody Maker.

Characteristics
Grebo bands drew influences from a diverse array of genres, including dance-rock, psychedelia, pop, hip hop, punk rock and electronica. Pop Will Eat Itself adopted an industrial alternative rock style that combined "heavy metal and hard rock guitar riffs, electro-dance rhythms, samples and rap vocals." While Gaye Bykers on Acid's use of hip-hop and dance beats was considered as "a major innovation in mid-'80s alternative rock," Ned's Atomic Dustbin focused on "the hyper punk aspect" of the movement, relying on "catchy hooks and a dual-bass sound."

Grebo artists and fans sported long hair, dreadlocks and baggy shorts.

References

Further reading
GREBO by Mick Mercer, Melody Maker, 1987. reproduced here

Alternative rock genres
Punk rock genres
Youth culture in the United Kingdom
English styles of music
British rock music genres
Alternative dance